Metro is a 2013 Russian disaster film directed by Anton Megerdichev. It is based on the 2005 novel of the same name by Dmitry Safonov.

Plot 
In Moscow Metro, in the tunnel's station Park Kultury, built in 1935, is starting to fail. One tunnel night crawler, Sergeitch (Sergey Sosnowski), sees a leak in the tunnel where it runs under the Moscow River and informs the assistant station master (Michael Fateev), who mocks the old man for worrying about it, saying it's only groundwater. Meanwhile, Irina Garina (Svetlana Hodchenkova) is torn between her lover, businessman Vlad Konstantinov (Anatoly Bely), and her husband, surgeon Andrei Garin (Sergei Puskepalis). Konstantinov tries to persuade Irina to divorce Andrei. Arriving from a trip abroad, Irina spends the night with Konstantinov rather than going home. Andrei has to take their daughter Ksenya (Anfisa Wistinghausen) to school but by chance, they take the "Garden" metro station. Simultaneously, Konstantinov arrives, hurrying to work and forced to park his car because of traffic jams. Meanwhile, Sergeitch, drinking with casual acquaintance Galina (Elena Panova) next to the "Garden", recalls that the water leaking into the tunnel smelled of slime, which means that it cannot be groundwater. They are detained by the police for drinking alcohol in a public place but Galina manages to escape, and flees into the subway. In custody Sergeitch asks for a phone to tell the dispatcher everything, but the police turn a deaf ear to his pleas.

In the tunnel the water breaches the ceiling. The driver of the train (Konstantin Ovseannicov) that by coincidence contains Garin, Konstantinov and Galina activates the emergency brake. The train derails and crashes into the water and rubble. Some of the passengers are killed. Konstantinov, instead of going along the rails, climbs onto the roof of the car. Crawling along, he sees Garin, who is trying to find Ksjushu in a pile of bodies, and helps Garin. Garin is going to follow the others but Konstantinov stops him, pointing out that the contact rail is still electrified. The water rises, a short circuit occurs, and all who did not escape the flooded area of the tunnel die from shock. Garin, Konstantinov and Galina, courier Michael (Stanislav Duzhkinov) and a couple, Denis (Alex Bardukov) and Alisa (Katerina Shpitsa), finally can seek to escape. All except Michael hurriedly make their way into a passage leading to a maintenance shaft. Michael, being very frightened, refuses to enter the passage and dies when the car rolls over.

From the passage the protagonists fall into a small bunker, built during the construction of underground. Above it, the vertical maintenance shaft ends in a sewer grate. However, they cannot reach the grate, which is too high, nor can they use their mobile phones underground. The water level in the tunnel and in the well begins to rise rapidly. Tension between Konstantinov and Garin rises, as the latter cannot understand why Konstantinov feels an interest in his daughter. When the water level raises them to the level of the grate, Garin and Konstantinov manage to phone Irina but only have time to tell her that they are in the bunker. They try to attract attention through the bars, but to no avail. Irina is hysterically trying to inform the rescue team that people are in the bunker. But at this time the pressure of the water rips off the train head and the water level in the shaft falls sharply, pulling the characters back into the tunnel. The rescuers descend into the bunker, but seeing the wet walls, assume that all who were there most likely drowned.

The protagonists get to the ghost station "Borodino" (close to the "Garden") and climb onto the platform to rest. Garin makes some indirect hints to Konstantinov that show that he realizes that Konstantinov and Irina are lovers. Konstantinov and Garin fight and Konstantinov nearly drowns in the water.

In the tunnel where the train is stuck the overhead arch collapses and waters fill the tunnel. The leaders of the rescue operation manage to shut off the water. The protagonists get to the bunker and finally get out through the bars on the street. Alisa and Dennis together leave the hospital. Garin and Irina tensely meet in a scene where Garin silently deflects all her pleas. The film ends with a scene where Konstantinov is driving around in different directions following the ambulance containing Garin.

Cast 
Sergei Puskepalis as Andrei Garin
Anatoly Bely as Vladislav Konstantinov
Svetlana Khodchenkova as Irina Garina
Anfisa Vistingauzen as Ksenia Garina
Aleksey Bardukov as Denis Istomin 
Katerina Shpitsa as Alisa
Yelena Panova as Galina
Sergey Sosnovsky as Petrunin

Criticism
The film received mostly positive reviews from critics.  However, the picture has received negative reviews because of the discrepancy between the plot of the film and the real underground and its services. The movie grossed $12 million in the domestic market and $15 million worldwide against a budget of $9 million thereby making it an average commercial success.

References

External links 

2010s disaster films
Russian thriller drama films
Russian disaster films
Films set in Moscow
2013 thriller drama films
2013 films
2010s Russian-language films
Films scored by Yuri Poteyenko